A Light Shines is the first collection of recordings from Sacred Mother Tongue released in association with EMI Label Services and their first release since Ruin of Man in 2009. The EP was the precursor to their Out Of The Darkness album, released in 2013, and contains the single "Evolve/Become".

Reception

Metal Hammer gave the EP 8/10, calling it an "anthem loaded, stadium bothering masterclass". Kerrang! magazine awarded the EP 3 Ks stating that it set the band up well for the forthcoming album.

Track listing

Personnel
Sacred Mother Tongue
Darrin South – vocals
Andy James – lead guitar
Josh Gurner – bass guitar
Lee Newell – drums

Music videos

References

2012 EPs
Sacred Mother Tongue EPs
EMI Records EPs